John Franklin Titus (February 21, 1876 – January 8, 1943), nicknamed "Tightpants", was an American professional baseball outfielder, who played in Major League Baseball (MLB) for the Philadelphia Phillies (1903–12) and Boston Braves (1912–13). Titus’ most notable accomplishment was that he led the National League (NL) in being hit by pitches (16), in 1909 and ranks 74th on the MLB career Hit By Pitch list (94). 

To baseball card collectors, Titus is also notable for the card depicting him in the T206 set, as it is the only one in which the player has a mustache. At the time of his death, it was noted that Titus was the last player to sport a handlebar mustache. It was noted when Titus shaved his mustache during spring training in March 1908.

In 11 big league seasons, Titus played in 1,402 games and had 4,960 at bats, 738 runs, 1,401 hits, 253 doubles, 72 triples, 38 home runs, 564 RBI, 140 stolen bases, 620 walks, a .282 batting average, a .373 on-base percentage, a .385 slugging percentage, 1,912 total bases, and 144 sacrifice hits.

On January 8, 1943, Titus died in his hometown of St. Clair, Pennsylvania, at the age of 66.

References

Sources

1876 births
1943 deaths
People from St. Clair, Pennsylvania
Baseball players from Pennsylvania
Major League Baseball right fielders
Philadelphia Phillies players
Boston Braves players
Pottsville (minor league baseball) players
Concord Marines players
Kansas City Blues (baseball) players